The following is a list of those who have been Lord Lieutenant of Leitrim. 

There were lieutenants of counties in Ireland until the reign of James II, when they were renamed governors. The office of Lord Lieutenant was recreated on 23 August 1831. 

Leitrim became part of the Irish Free State upon its founding in 1922 after the war of independence.

Governors

 Nathaniel Clements: 1758–1777
 Robert Clements, 1st Earl of Leitrim: 1777–1804
 Walter Jones: 1805–1831
 Henry John Clements: 1808–1831
 Luke White: 1817–1824

Lord Lieutenants
 The 2nd Earl of Leitrim: 7 October 1831 – 31 December 1854
 Edward King Tenison: 31 January 1855 – December 1856
 The 7th Earl of Granard: 4 December 1856 – September 1872
 The 4th Viscount Southwell: 10 September 1872 – 26 April 1878
 The 2nd Baron Harlech: 27 June 1878 – 25 June 1904
 The 3rd Baron Harlech: 19 August 1904 – 1922

References

Leitrim
History of County Leitrim